Deh-e Heydar (also Romanized as Deh-e Ḩeydar, Deh Heidar, and Deh Ḩeydar) is a village in Gamasiyab Rural District, in the Central District of Nahavand County, Hamadan Province, Iran. At the 2006 census, its population was 674, in 181 families.

References 

Populated places in Nahavand County